Indus Group of Institutions, named after the "Sindhu" (Indus River), is a nonprofit charitable trust that along with Param Mitra Manav Nirman Sansthan is owned by the Sindhu Education Foundation to run several educational institutes in various states of India including Haryana and Chhattisgarh.

History
Indus Group of Institutions was founded by Mitter Sen Sindhu, the father of politician Abhimanyu Sindhu of the Bharatiya Janata Party (BJP).

Educational institutes
The Indus Group of Institutions, along with Sindhu Education Foundation and Param Mitra Manav Nirman Sansthan, runs several educational institutes including the following:
 Delhi Public School, Bilaspur
 Delhi Public School, Durg
 Indus College of Education, Rohtak
 Indus College of Nursing, Khanda Kheri
 Indus Institute of Engineering and Technology, Kinana
 Indus Public School, Rohtak
 Indus Public School, Hisar
 Indus Public School, Jind
 Indus Public School, Kaithal
 Param Mitra Kanya Vidya Niketan Senior Secondary School, Khanda Kheri
 Mata Jiyo Devi College of Education, Khanda Kheri
 Param Mitter Industrial Training Institute, Korba, Chhattisgarh

References

External links

Education in Haryana
Charities based in India